Mostly Martha can refer to:

Mostly Martha (Bella Martha), a 2001 German film
"Mostly Martha", a popular version of Friedrich von Flotow's aria M’apparì tutt’amor, recorded by The Crew-Cuts